25 St. Ann Street in Manchester, England, is a Victorian bank with attached manager's house constructed in 1848 for Heywood's Bank by John Edgar Gregan. The bank is "one of the finest palazzo-inspired buildings in the city."
. It is a Grade II* listed building as of 25 February 1952.

The bank is built of sandstone, "beautifully finished", while the manager's house is of more modest red brick.  The ground floor is rusticated with the upper floor windows having pediments and balconies.  The bank and the manager's house are linked by a single-storey entrance, "an arrangement recalling the Palazzo Pandolfini in Florence."

See also

Grade II* listed buildings in Greater Manchester
Listed buildings in Manchester-M2

Notes

References

Grade II* listed buildings in Manchester